The 7th constituency of Borsod-Abaúj-Zemplén County is one of the single member constituencies of the National Assembly, the national legislature of Hungary. The constituency standard abbreviation: Borsod-Abaúj-Zemplén 07. OEVK.

Since 2014, it has been represented by András Tállai of the Fidesz–KDNP party alliance.

Geography
The 7th constituency is located in southern part of Borsod-Abaúj-Zemplén County.

List of municipalities
The constituency includes the following municipalities:

Members
The constituency was first represented by András Tállai of the Fidesz from 2014, and he was re-elected in 2018 and 2022.

References

Borsod-Abauj-Zemplen 7th